Burak Yılmaz (born 15 July 1985) is a Turkish professional footballer who plays as a forward for and captains Eredivisie club Fortuna Sittard.

Yılmaz is one of nine players to play for each of the Big Three clubs  of Turkey, and one of only two players who have played for these three clubs as well as Trabzonspor (also referred as the "Big Four"), along with Sergen Yalçın.

Born in Antalya, Turkey, son of former Antalyaspor goalkeeper Fikret Yılmaz, Burak Yılmaz started to play football at Antalyaspor, where he signed his first professional contract in July 2002 and made his professional debut in the 2002–03 season of the TFF First League. Following four seasons at Antalyaspor, Yılmaz joined Beşiktaş prior to the 2006–07 season, where he played one and a half seasons and was primarily deployed as a winger. Yılmaz had a short spell in Manisaspor before he joined Fenerbahçe for the 2008–09 Süper Lig season. Loaned out to Eskişehirspor for the following season, Yılmaz was transferred to Trabzonspor in the winter transfer window of 2009–10 season, where he made his major career breakthrough under the management of Şenol Güneş, becoming Süper Lig top scorer with 33 goals in the 2011–12 season.

Following three seasons spent in Trabzonspor, where he won a Turkish Cup and Turkish Super Cup, Yılmaz joined Galatasaray, staying for four seasons and winning two Süper Lig titles in 2012–13 and 2014–15, as well as being Süper Lig top scorer for the second time in his career in the 2012–13 season. In 2016, Yılmaz joined Chinese Super League club Beijing Guoan for two seasons, where he scored 28 goals in total. Yılmaz then returned to Trabzonspor for a second spell which lasted two seasons. For the 2018–19 season, Yılmaz returned to Beşiktaş for another spell, scoring eleven and thirteen goals respectively in his two seasons back, before joining French Ligue 1 club Lille in 2020, helping the side win its first league title for ten years.

Representing Turkey in different youth age groups between 2001 and 2006, Yılmaz made his senior debut in a friendly game against Azerbaijan in 2006. With 31 goals, Yılmaz is Turkey's second all-time highest goalscorer after Hakan Şükür. He played his last game for the national team in 2022.

Club career

Antalyaspor
Yılmaz started his professional career in Antalyaspor, where he was promoted to the senior team at the age of 16. He scored his first two goals at professional level in the 2004–05 season against Karşıyaka at Izmir Alsancak Stadium on 29 August 2004. In the same season, Yılmaz played 29 league matches, scoring 8 goals, thus helping his team avoid relegation. He contributed to the success of the team's promotion to the Süper Lig after finishing second in Division 1 in the 2005–06 season, scoring 9 goals in 24 matches. During his stint at Antalyaspor, Yılmaz played 70 league games and scored 17 league goals in total.

Beşiktaş
Yılmaz joined Beşiktaş in the 2006–07 summer transfer window. He made his Süper Lig debut on 6 August 2006 against Manisaspor, and scored his first goal against Konyaspor in a 3–1 win for Beşiktaş. He also scored against Trabzonspor. In his first season, he scored 5 goals in 30 league appearances as Beşiktaş finished the season in second place. In the same season, he made seven appearances in the Turkish Cup, scoring once. His form dropped dramatically during the 2007–08 season. In January 2008, Yılmaz joined Manisaspor as part of an exchange deal, and later to Fenerbahçe on 29 June 2008.

Fenerbahçe
On 29 June 2008, Yılmaz was transferred to Fenerbahçe and was presented at a news conference wearing the number 7 shirt. On the contrary to his "promising youngster" image in Manisaspor and Beşiktaş, he had been a disappointment during his spell in Fenerbahçe, only playing six games and failing to score in the 2008–09 season.

Trabzonspor

In February 2010, Yılmaz joined Trabzonspor on a permanent deal. Following the arrival of Şenol Güneş as team manager, Yılmaz made his Trabzonspor debut on 15 February 2010, playing last 15 minutes against Bursaspor on a 1–1 draw. On 26 February 2013, he scored against his previous team Antalyaspor. Yılmaz played at Turkish Cup final where Trabzonspor defeated Fenerbahçe by 3–1, on 5 May 2010. Ten days later, Trabzonspor played against Fenerbahçe again in lask week of Süper Lig fixtures in which Yılmaz scored in 23rd minute, as parties shared points after a 1–1 draw, causing Fenerbahçe to jeopardise their title chances in contention with Bursaspor. Yılmaz became leading goalscorer of Trabzonspor with 19 goals in 30 league games and July 2011 he signed a new four-year contract with the club.

In 2010–11 season, Yılmaz displayed a high-level attacking attributes, scoring the winners against Beşiktaş and Galatasaray and Bursaspor, where Trabzonspor finalised the fixtures on second spot. In 2011–12 season, where a play-off stage applied after 34-weeks-regular-fixtures, Yılmaz scored 33 goals in 34 appearances at regular season, setting a new club record previously held by Fatih Tekke who scored 31 goals in the 2004–05 season.

Galatasaray

In July 2012, Yılmaz joined Galatasaray from Trabzonspor for €5m transfer fee, with a four-year-contract with an additional one-season-option. His contract consisted of  €2.3 million seasonal wage with a €20,000 bonus per-appearance.

On 2 September 2012, he scored his first goal for Galatasaray against Bursaspor, as the game finished 3–2, making it Galatasaray's historic 1000th league win.

Yılmaz scored the only goal for Galatasaray as the game ended in a 1–1 home draw against Eskişehirspor. On 23 October 2012, he scored a goal from a header against CFR Cluj as the game ended in a 1–1 draw at third match-week in Group H of the 2012–13 UEFA Champions League group stage. On 28 October 2012, Yılmaz scored his 100th career goal, during a 3–0 win against Kayserispor, maintaining their position as league leaders.

On 7 November 2012, Burak netted a hat-trick in a 3–1 away win over CFR Cluj in the Champions League,
becoming the first Turkish player to score three goals in a Champions League game since Tuncay Şanlı. At Champions League group stage, he scored once again, this time against Manchester United in which Galatasaray won 1–0. Yılmaz finished group stage of the as top scorer with 6 goals in total 501 minutes played, ahead of Cristiano Ronaldo, who scored the same number of goals in 540 minutes. In the Champions League round of 16, he scored in both legs against Schalke 04, before his team was eliminated by Real Madrid in the quarter-finals.

On 23 November 2013, Burak scored his 100th Süper Lig goal against Sivasspor in a 2–1 home win.

Beijing Guoan
On 5 February 2016, Galatasaray announced the transfer of Yılmaz to Chinese Super League club Beijing Guoan for €8 million transfer fee. Trabzonspor was to receive €2 million from Galatasaray, following the transaction agreement.

Return to Trabzonspor
On 2 August 2017, Yılmaz returned to Trabzonspor, for family reasons. He managed to score 23 goals in 25 matches during the 2017–18 season.

Return to Beşiktaş
Yılmaz scored 25 goals in 40 official games during his second period at Beşiktaş.

Lille
Lille announced the arrival of Yılmaz on 1 August 2020. The parties agreed upon a two-season-long contract. Substituted with Jonathan David in 64th minute, Yılmaz made his Ligue 1 debut against Rennes at first week encounter of 2020–21 season, ended 1–1, held at Stade Pierre-Mauroy, on 22 August 2020. On week 6, Yılmaz scored his first league goal against Strasbourg as Lille beat their opponents with 3–0 being the final score, on 4 October 2020. On 25 April 2021, he scored a brace in a 3–2 comeback away win over fellow title challengers Lyon. On 23 May 2021, he scored a penalty in a 2–1 away win over Angers, to secure the fourth Ligue 1 title for Lille in their history. He became the first player to score at least 15 goals in his first Ligue 1 season with Lille since Moussa Sow hit 25 in their title-winning campaign a decade prior.

Fortuna Sittard
On 21 June 2022, Yılmaz signed a five-year contract with Fortuna Sittard in the Netherlands, the first two years of the contract are in a player role, and the last three are as a coach.

International career

On 12 April 2006, Yılmaz made his international debut for Turkey under coach Fatih Terim in a 1–1 away draw with Azerbaijan in a friendly match. On 3 June 2011, he scored his first goal in a 1–1 away draw with Belgium during the UEFA Euro 2012 qualifying. Later on, he was part of Turkey squad in the UEFA Euro 2016 and UEFA Euro 2020.

On 24 March 2021, he scored his first international hat-trick in a 4–2 win over the Netherlands in the 2022 FIFA World Cup qualification. On 24 March 2022, he played his last match for Turkey against Portugal in the second round of same qualifications, in which he scored a goal but missed a crucial penalty to equalise, in a match which ended in a 3–1 defeat. He announced his retirement from international football following the match.

Personal life
Yılmaz is the son of former professional footballer and manager Fikret Yılmaz. Yılmaz has two daughters from his marriage to İstem Atilla, which lasted for four years between 2014 and 2018. In 2020, the couple decided to get together again and remarried.

Career statistics

Club

International

Scores and results list Turkey's goal tally first, score column indicates score after each Yılmaz goal.

Honours
Beşiktaş
 Turkish Cup: 2006–07

Trabzonspor
 Turkish Cup: 2009–10
 Turkish Super Cup: 2010

Galatasaray
 Süper Lig: 2012–13, 2014–15
 Turkish Cup: 2013–14, 2014–15, 2015-16
 Turkish Super Cup: 2013, 2015, 2016

Lille
Ligue 1: 2020–21
Trophée des Champions: 2021

Individual
 Gol Kralı: 2011–12, 2012–13
 UNFP Player of the Month: April 2021
Ligue 1 Goal of the Year: 2020–21
Lille Player of the Season: 2020–21

References

External links

 
 
 
 
 
 

1985 births
Antalyaspor footballers
Association football forwards
Beijing Guoan F.C. players
Beşiktaş J.K. footballers
Chinese Super League players
Eskişehirspor footballers
Expatriate footballers in China
Expatriate footballers in France
Expatriate footballers in the Netherlands
Fenerbahçe S.K. footballers
Fortuna Sittard players
Galatasaray S.K. footballers
Ligue 1 players
Lille OSC players
Living people
Manisaspor footballers
Sportspeople from Antalya
Süper Lig players
Trabzonspor footballers
Turkey B international footballers
Turkey international footballers
Turkey under-21 international footballers
Turkey youth international footballers
Turkish expatriate footballers
Turkish expatriate sportspeople in China
Turkish expatriate sportspeople in France
Turkish expatriate sportspeople in the Netherlands
Turkish footballers
UEFA Euro 2016 players
UEFA Euro 2020 players